Cheilochromis is a genus of freshwater fish in the cichlid family. It contains the sole species Cheilochromis euchilus, the Malawi thicklip, which is endemic to Lake Malawi in East Africa where it prefers near-shore areas with rocky bottoms.  This species reaches a length of  TL.  It can also be found in the aquarium trade.

References

Haplochromini
Fish of Lake Malawi
Taxa named by Ethelwynn Trewavas
Monotypic freshwater fish genera
Taxobox binomials not recognized by IUCN